The 1970 Cupa României Final was the 32nd final of Romania's most prestigious football cup competition. It was disputed between Steaua București and Dinamo București, and was won by Steaua București after a game with 3 goals. It was the 10th cup for Steaua București.

Match details

See also 
List of Cupa României finals

References

External links
Romaniansoccer.ro

1970
Cupa
Romania
1970 Cupa Romaniei
FC Steaua București matches